Dichromia indicatalis is a moth of the family Erebidae first described by Francis Walker in 1859. It has a large distribution area of Indo-Australian tropics to Japan and Solomon Islands.

Forewings richer darker brown. Postmedial variably oblique and triarcuate. There is a black exterior to the apical lens. In male antennae, cilia on basal part is significantly shorter.

References

Moths of Asia
Moths described in 1859
Erebidae
Hypeninae